Acharagma aguirreanum is a critically endangered microendemic cactus. It has a range of about one square kilometer in the calcareous semi-desert of the Sierra de la Paila in Coahuila, Mexico. Its population is estimated at less than 1000 individuals. Its only major threat is illegal collecting.

References

 

Endemic flora of Mexico
Critically endangered plants
Cactoideae